William Clavering-Cowper, 2nd Earl Cowper (13 August 1709 – 18 September 1764), styled Viscount Fordwich between 1718 and 1723, was a British peer and courtier.

Born William Cowper, he was the eldest son of William Cowper, 1st Earl Cowper, by Mary, daughter of John Clavering, of Chopwell, County Durham. He later assumed the additional surname of Clavering on the death of his maternal uncle. He succeeded his father in the earldom in October 1723, aged 14. In 1744 he was appointed Lord-Lieutenant of Hertfordshire, a post he held until his death. He was also a Lord of the Bedchamber to George II.

Lord Cowper was twice married. He married firstly Lady Henrietta, daughter of Henry de Nassau d'Auverquerque, 1st Earl of Grantham, in 1732. After her death in September 1747 he married secondly Lady Georgiana Caroline, daughter of John Carteret, 2nd Earl Granville, and widow of John Spencer, in 1750. He died in September 1764, aged 55, and was succeeded in the earldom by his son from his first marriage, George Clavering-Cowper, 3rd Earl Cowper. The Countess Cowper died in August 1780.

Relatives

Arms

References

1709 births
1764 deaths
Earls Cowper
Lord-Lieutenants of Hertfordshire